The Citizen was the original name of a free monthly newspaper distributed in the Kansas City Metropolitan Area and renamed in May 2011 to The Monitor.  The paper covers state politics in Jefferson City, Missouri and Topeka, Kansas, as well as regional issues in Cass County, Missouri, Clay County, Missouri, Jackson County, Missouri, Platte County, Missouri, Johnson County, Kansas and Wyandotte County, Kansas.

The Monitor produces a mix of News and Opinion journalism, openly declaring a Center-right bias. Regular contributors include the Show-Me Institute, based in St. Louis, Missouri, and the Kansas Policy Institute, based in Wichita, Kansas. Both are free-market Think tanks focused on state policy issues.

The Monitor was started in February 2011. Citizen Publications, LLC owns the paper. It ceased publication in September 2011.

Staff 
Publisher - Greg Brooks
Managing Editor - Greg Lipford

External links
 The Monitor

Mass media in the Kansas City metropolitan area
Companies based in Kansas City, Missouri
Newspapers published in Kansas
Newspapers published in Missouri
Publications established in 2011